Invisible Essence: The Little Prince is a Canadian documentary film, directed by Charles Officer and released in 2018. The film profiles and explores the enduring cultural impact of Antoine de Saint-Exupéry's influential novel The Little Prince.

The film premiered in Los Angeles, California in October 2018, before going into Canadian commercial release in 2019.

The film received two Canadian Screen Award nominations at the 8th Canadian Screen Awards in 2020, for Best Feature Length Documentary and Best Editing in a Documentary (Bruce Lapointe).

References

External links 
 

2018 films
Canadian documentary films
Films directed by Charles Officer
Films about novels
The Little Prince
2010s English-language films
2010s Canadian films